The HAL Prachand (IPA: prəcəɳɖ, lit."Fierce") is an Indian multi-role, light attack helicopter designed and manufactured by the Hindustan Aeronautics Limited (HAL) under project LCH. It has been ordered by the Indian Air Force and the Indian Army. Its flight ceiling is the highest among all attack helicopters in the world.

The true impetus for the development of the LCH Prachand came in the form of the Kargil War, a conflict fought between India and neighbouring Pakistan in 1999, which revealed the Indian armed forces lacked a suitable armed rotorcraft capable of operating unrestricted in the high-altitude theatre. Accordingly, both HAL and the Indian armed forces commenced exploratory efforts towards the conceptualisation of a combat helicopter to perform in this role. During 2006, the company announced that it had launched a development programme to produce such a rotorcraft, referred to simply as the LCH or Light Combat Helicopter. Originally, the LCH was anticipated to attain initial operating capability (IOC) by December 2010, however development of the type was protracted and subject to several delays, some of which having been attributed to suppliers.

The LCH Prachand drew extensively on an earlier indigenous helicopter developed and manufactured by HAL, the ALH Dhruv; using this rotorcraft as a starting point has been attributed as significantly reducing the cost of the programme. On 29 March 2010, the first LCH prototype performed its maiden flight. An extensive test programme, involving a total of four prototypes, was conducted. During mid-2016, the LCH was recognised as having completed its performance trials, paving way for the certification of its basic configuration. 

On 26 August 2017, limited series production of the Prachand was formally inaugurated. On 19 November 2021, Prime Minister Narendra Modi formally handed over the LCH to IAF Air Chief Marshal Vivek Ram Chaudhari, clearing way for full scale induction. On 3 October 2022, the LCH was formally inducted into the IAF and was officially named "Prachand". By November, Indian army had begun to move its LCH helicopters on LAC near Chinese border.

Development

Origins

During the late 1990s, India and neighbouring nation Pakistan engaged in a brief but intensely-fought conflict commonly known as the Kargil War. This war, in which various elements of the Indian military were deployed, revealed operational shortcomings and areas for improvement, particularly the requirement for an attack helicopter that would be suitable for use within the high altitude climates in which some combat operations were fought along the north-western border region. Accordingly, there was considerable interest in not only the acquisition of a suitable contemporary rotorcraft for the task (as well as to replace several aging types in Indian military service, such as the Cheetah and Chetak), but for such an aircraft to be domestically developed and manufactured in India as well.

During early 2004, Indian aerospace manufacturer Hindustan Aeronautics Limited (HAL) declared that the company was in the midst of discussions with the Indian armed forces on the prospects for a potential light combat helicopter derivative of the company's existing Dhruv utility helicopter platform for the requirement. During late 2004, the Indian armed forces decided to curtail plans to order foreign-built attack helicopters in anticipation of a decision to formally select the tentative LCH. During 2006, HAL publicly announced that it had embarked upon the development of such an attack helicopter, which it referred to as the Light Combat Helicopter (LCH). During late 2006, the Indian government decided to aid the fledgling programme via the issuing of external finance to support the design phase of the LCH's development, this was done as to aid the attack helicopter in conforming with the established requirements of the Indian Army and the Indian Air Force.

The LCH is a derivative of the HAL Dhruv, which had been developed during the 1990s and inducted into the Indian Armed Forces during the 2000s. By 2010, the Indian Air Force was reportedly set to acquire 65 LCHs while the Indian Army was to also procure 114 LCHs for its own purposes.

Development of the LCH did not progress to schedule. On 21 June 2007, HAL chairman Ashok Baweja announced that and stated that the first prototype LCH was to conduct its maiden flight during October 2008, and stated that the company was currently "halfway through the design stage". During November 2008, the company declared that, while the first flight had been postponed until March 2009, it was still working to secure initial operating capability (IOC) for the LCH by December 2010, while it was still anticipated that the type would receive its Final Operational Clearance (FOC) during 2011. During February 2009, Baweja announced another six-month delay to the development timetable, he also attributed some of the setbacks in the programme as having been a result of HAL's suppliers failing to deliver necessary tooling on time.

Prototype and testing

During late January 2010, Nayak stated that the LCH had successfully completed initial ground tests and was now ready to fly; the first flight was anticipated to occur during February. On 4 February 2010, the first LCH prototype completed its first powered ground run. On 29 March 2010, the maiden flight of the LCH was conducted by the type's first LCH Technology Demonstrator (TD-1). It flew a 20-minute flight from HAL's Helicopter Complex at Bengaluru, during which the rotorcraft carried out low speed, low altitude checks on the systems on board. Following the completion of the flight, the crew reported that the performance of the helicopter and systems were satisfactory.

On 23 May 2010, following the successful completion of the third test flight of the LCH prototype; it was deemed to have fulfilled the desired parameters and thus enabled further armed tests to proceed. The second LCH prototype (TD-2) differed considerably from its predecessor, being fitted with armaments and featuring a substantial reduction in weight; it was publicly unveiled at Aero India 2011 during February 2011. Speaking at the event, Nayak stated that the programme had exceeded human and payload requirements mandated by IAF for the development. On 28 June 2011, TD-2 performed its first flight, allowing it to join the test programme.

On 1 July 2012, the LCH began a series of trials near Chennai; among other elements, the onboard air speed measurement system was evaluated and various component stresses were measured. Between late June and early July 2012, the second prototype, TD-2, was involved in a series of sea level trials. These trials covered flight performance, the measurement of loads, and the rotorcraft's handling qualities.

During mid-2012, the third LCH prototype, which was claimed to be significantly lighter than either of its predecessors as well as incorporating various other improvements, was reportedly set to be delivered. The third prototype, TD-3, ultimately performed its maiden flight on 12 November 2014 for a duration of 20 minutes. Both TD3 and TD4 were extensively used during the test programme for the purpose of testing the rotorcraft's mission sensors and weapon systems, which involved a series of live-firing trials. Reportedly, a total of ₹ 126 crore (US$20.2 million) had been sanctioned for the development and structural build of the fourth prototype.

During early 2015, a number of cold weather trials involving the third prototype (TD-3) were carried out at Air Force Station Leh. During these tests, engine start-up tests (performed using internal batteries after lengthy overnight exposure to the cold climate without special protective measures being applied) proved satisfactory at the temperatures as low as −18 °C at an altitude of 4.1 km. Several flights were also carried out to assess the rotorcraft's high altitude performance and low speed handling. During the course of these tests, the LCH gained the distinction of being the first attack helicopter to land in Siachen, having repeatedly landed at several high altitude helipads, some of which being as high as 13,600 feet to 15,800 feet.

During June 2015, the LCH successfully completed hot weather flight trials at Jodhpur, during which the type was exposed to temperatures ranging from 39 to 42 °C. The flight testing reportedly covered 'temperature survey of engine bay and hydraulic system', 'assessment of performance', 'handling qualities and loads' at different 'all up weights', 'low speed handling' and 'height-velocity diagram establishment'.

On 1 December 2015, LCH TD4 completed its first flight. By March 2016, the LCH had reportedly completed basic performance flight testing and outstation trials, including a number of live-fire tests involving prototype TD-3 firing 70 mm rockets in its weaponized configuration. By mid-2016, certification firing trials had commenced, these included tests of the integration of its mission sensors, such as the electro-optical system, helmet pointing system, and of the various armaments – air-to-air missiles, turret gun and rockets – that the type can deploy.

During mid-2016, the LCH was recognised as having completed its performance trials, paving way for the certification of its basic configuration; a letter confirming this status was hand-delivered to HAL by CEMILAC in the presence of the Indian Defence Minister on 16 October 2015. On 26 August 2017, Defence Minister Arun Jaitley formally inaugurated full-scale production of the LCH.

On 31 January 2018, LCH TD2 was flown with an Automatic Flight Control System (AFCS) designed by HAL. The new system is expected to replace the previously imported Automatic Flight Control System. It was reported that a radar is under development for LCH.

On 17 January 2019, LCH completed weapons trials with the successful firing of Mistral-2 air-to-air missile at a flying target. In the same day, HAL announced that the LCH is ready for operational service after completing the required weapon integration tests.

On 21 February 2019, Thales announced that it was awarded a contract to supply 135 70 mm rockets for 15 LCHs alongside 18 Dhruvs.

Production 
The LCH was declared ready for production in February 2020. HAL's Helicopter Division, based in Bengaluru, has established a dedicated hangar to accommodate the LCH assembly line. During September 2020, the first LCH of the limited series production (LSP) batch had reportedly commenced ground-based testing.

A total of 162 LCHs are planned to be ordered as of 2020. 15 Limited Series Production variants for Army and Air Force are being built at HAL and the first two were scheduled to be delivered by March 2022. An additional hangar was set up in which reportedly is capable of achieving a peak production of 30 helicopters per year. On 22 July 2021, it was announced that HAL will deliver the first three LCHs to the Indian Air Force. On 30 March 2022, the Cabinet Committee on Security approved the limited series production of 15 LCHs, including ten for the IAF and five for the Indian Army. The contract is worth Rs. 3,887 Cr along with infranstructure sanctions at Rs. 377 Cr.

Design

Overview 

The HAL Light Combat Helicopter (LCH) is a multirole combat helicopter, designed to perform various attack profiles, including relatively high altitude flight. The design and development of the LCH was done in-house, by the Rotary Wing Research and Design Centre (RWR&DC), an internal design office of HAL dedicated to the design of helicopters.

Equipped with a two-person tandem cockpit to accommodate a pilot and co-pilot/gunner, it has been developed to perform both the anti-infantry and anti-armour missions. In addition to these roles, the LCH is intended to be used for a variety of operational purposes, such as to perform air defence against slow-moving aerial targets, including both manned aircraft and unmanned aerial vehicles (UAVs), participation in counter-insurgency operations (COIN) and Counter Surface Force Operations (CSFO), the destruction of enemy air defence operations and wider offensive use during urban warfare conditions, escort to special heliborne operations (SHBO), support of combat search and rescue (CSAR) operations, and armed aerial scouting duties. 
In terms of its basic configuration, the LCH possesses a relatively narrow fuselage and is equipped with stealth profiling, armour protection, and is equipped to conduct day-and-night combat operations. According to reports, the protective measures included in the rotorcraft includes a digital camouflage system, an infrared (IR) suppressor fitted to the engine exhaust, and an exterior covered by canted flat panels to minimise its radar cross-section (RCS). It is furnished with an integrated dynamic system, including a hingeless main rotor and bearing-less tail rotor, which works in conjunction with an anti-resonance isolation system to dampen vibrations. During Aero India 2011, HAL's Rotary Wing Research & Design Centre informed the press that the LCH is "probably the most agile design in the world because of its rotor".

The LCH had inherited many of its technical features from one of HAL's earlier indigenous rotorcraft, commonly known as the HAL Dhruv. Shared elements between the two helicopters include the power-plant used, both being powered by a pair of co-developed HAL/Turbomeca Shakti-1H1 derived from Safran Ardiden turboshaft engines, albeit fitted with infrared suppressors. The features that are unique to the rotorcraft includes its narrow fuselage, a crashworthy tricycle landing gear arrangement, crashworthy self-sealing fuel tanks, armour protection, and a low visibility profile; these design elements have been attributed as having resulted in a relatively lethal, agile and survivable rotorcraft.

Avionics and armaments

The LCH is furnished with a glass cockpit which accommodates an Integrated Avionics and Display System (IADS) which used an array of multifunction displays in conjunction with the onboard target acquisition and designation (TADS) system. A prominent element of the TADS system is the helmet mounted sight (HMS), which serves as the principal instrument for targeting and triggering the rotorcraft's armaments. The LCH is protected via an extensive electronic warfare suite which is provided by the South African division of Saab Group; this suite comprises various defensive elements to guard against several different threats, these include a radar warning receiver (RWR), laser warning receiver (LWR) and a missile approach warning (MAW) system.

The LCH is equipped with an integrated data link, which enables the type to participate in network-centric operations by facilitating the transfer of mission data to other platforms, comprising both airborne and ground-based elements. This networking capable is said to facilitate operational cooperation and force multiplication practices. The onboard sensor suite is Elbit CoMPASS, produced locally by Bharat Electronics Limited. It consists of a CCD camera, a forward looking infrared (FLIR) imaging sensor, a laser rangefinder and a laser designator to facilitate target acquisition under all-weather conditions, including under nighttime conditions. The series production variant will come with Integrated Architecture Display System (IADS) and Automatic Flight Control System (AFCS) which are locally developed by HAL with private sector industries.

During 2006, it was announced that HAL had selected the M621 cannon to serve as the gun armament of the helicopter. The M621 cannon is incorporated in a Nexter-built THL 20 turret and integrated into a helmet-mounted sight. Various missiles can also be equipped upon the LCH; these include a maximum of four quadpacked anti-tank guided missiles on two hardpoints underneath each wing - options are to include both foreign and Indian-built missiles, the latter in the form of the Helina anti-tank missile. In terms of air-to-air missiles, the LCH shall be capable of being armed with the MBDA ATAM missile. Payloads of 70 mm FZ275 LGR rockets are also available as offensive options for attacking targets with.

Operational history

During November 2016, the Indian Ministry of Defense (MoD) authorised the purchase of an initial batch of 15 LCHs with 10 for the Indian Air Force (IAF) and 5 for the Indian Army Aviation Corps (AAC), referred to as being a limited series production order. By mid-2017, the AAC had placed combined orders for 114 LCHs, while the IAF had a total of 65 LCHs on order. During early 2017, it was reported that the LCH's initial operating capability (IOC) with the Indian armed forces was expected to occur by 2018. The AAC intended to deploy the indigenous LCH alongside the American-built Boeing AH-64 Apache attack helicopter.

Achieving export sales for the LCH has been a stated priority of both HAL and the Indian government. During mid-2016, a spokesperson for the Indian Defence Ministry stated the ministry was in the progress of holding discussions with several unidentified African nations on the topic of the LCH. On 21 October 2022, Argentine officials visited HAL facilities to examine the Prachand as Argentina expressed interest in the helicopter.

On 7 August 2020, IAF's Vice Chief Air Marshal Harjit Singh Arora flew an LCH from Thoise to Leh accompanied by a HAL test pilot in full mission configuration. On 12 August 2020, HAL announced that the Indian Air Force has deployed two LCH prototypes to Ladakh for conducting armed patrols from forward air bases. It can perform offensive operations at Siachen Glacier-Saltoro Mountains region. In January 2021, government gave initial approval for the production of an initial batch of 15 LCHs, ten for the IAF and five for the AAC.

On 1 June 2022, an attack squadron was raised by the Army Aviation Corps in Bangalore. A total of seven squadrons are planned, each with ten helicopters. IAF formally inducted HAL Prachand into 143 Helicopter Unit at Jodhpur Air Force Station on 3 October 2022. Army variants of helicopter are to be armed with 20 mm nose gun, 70 mm rockets, helicopter-launched anti-tank guided missile and a new air-to-air missile different from the Mistral 2 missile used on air force variant. HAL Prachand performed at the Aero India 2023 airshow.

Operators

Indian Air Force: 4 delivered, 6 on order, 65 planned.
Jodhpur Air Force Station
 No. 143 Helicopter Unit (Dhanush) (2022)
Indian Army: 3 delivered, 2 on order, 95 planned.
Missamari Army Aviation Base
351 Army Aviation Squadron (2022)

Specifications

See also

References

External links

 HAL LCH web page
 HAL Light Combat Helicopter brochure

Indian military aircraft procurement programs
Prachand
Attack helicopters
2010s Indian helicopters
2010s Indian attack aircraft
Twin-turbine helicopters
Aircraft first flown in 2010